The Pago Bay Japanese pillboxes are a pair of World War II-era coastal defense pillboxes located on the shore of Pago Bay, located on the central east coast of Guam.  Built out of steel-reinforced concrete mixed with coral stone, these two structures were built by Japanese defenders during their occupation of the island between 1941 and 1944.  They were listed on the National Register of Historic Places in 1991 as Pagu' Pillbox I and Pagu' Pillbox II.  Neither of these would have seen substantial action during the 1944 liberation of Guam, whose military activities were focused on the western, central, and northern parts of the island.

Pillbox I
Its gun port is located in the south wall, with a view over Pago Bay, and there is a window in the western wall, overlooking the river. The main entrance is on the north side, providing access to the single chamber of the interior. At the time of its National Register listings in 1991, it was partially buried and filled with sand.

Pillbox II
It is a roughly hexagonal structure, with an open entrance on the west side, and gun ports facing north and northwest. In one section of the northwest wall there are impressions of tree trunks, suggesting trees were used as part of the form for its construction or that logs were incorporated into the structure. The floor consists of coral and limestone rocks.

See also
National Register of Historic Places listings in Guam

References

Buildings and structures on the National Register of Historic Places in Guam
World War II on the National Register of Historic Places in Guam
1940s establishments in Guam